Jere may refer to:
 Jere, Borno, a Local Government Area in Nigeria
 Jere, West Virginia, United States, an unincorporated community
 Jere language, a Nigerian dialect cluster
 Jere (name), a list of people with the masculine given name or surname